Miloje Grujić (born 17 December 1933) is a Yugoslav sprinter. He competed in the men's 4 × 400 metres relay at the 1960 Summer Olympics.

References

1933 births
Living people
Athletes (track and field) at the 1960 Summer Olympics
Yugoslav male sprinters
Olympic athletes of Yugoslavia
Place of birth missing (living people)